The 1922 Chicago White Sox season was a season in Major League Baseball. The team finished with a 77–77 record, excluding a tied game that was not included in the standings. They finished sixth in the American League, 17 games behind the pennant-winning New York Yankees. The White Sox scored 691 runs and allowed 691 runs for a run differential of zero, becoming the first team to finish with a .500 winning percentage and a zero run differential. This dubious feat was later matched by the 1983 San Diego Padres.

Regular season

Season standings

Record vs. opponents

Roster

Player stats

Batting

Starters by position 
Note: Pos = Position; G = Games played; AB = At bats; H = Hits; Avg. = Batting average; HR = Home runs; RBI = Runs batted in

Other batters 
Note: G = Games played; AB = At bats; H = Hits; Avg. = Batting average; HR = Home runs; RBI = Runs batted in

Pitching

Starting pitchers 
Note: G = Games pitched; IP = Innings pitched; W = Wins; L = Losses; ERA = Earned run average; SO = Strikeouts

Other pitchers 
Note: G = Games pitched; IP = Innings pitched; W = Wins; L = Losses; ERA = Earned run average; SO = Strikeouts

Relief pitchers 
Note: G = Games pitched; W = Wins; L = Losses; SV = Saves; ERA = Earned run average; SO = Strikeouts

References 

1922 Chicago White Sox at Baseball Reference

Chicago White Sox seasons
Chicago White Sox season
Chicago White